Rurki Kasba is a census town in Patiala district in the Indian state of Punjab.

Demographics
 India census, Rurki Kasba had a population of 8186. Males constitute 55% of the population and females 45%. Rurki Kasba has an average literacy rate of 69%, higher than the national average of 59.5%: male literacy is 74%, and female literacy is 63%. In Rurki Kasba, 14% of the population is under 6 years of age.

References

Cities and towns in Patiala district